Eliseo Lee Alcon is an American politician serving as a member of the New Mexico House of Representatives from the 6th district. Elected in 2008, he assumed office in January 2009.

Elections
2012 Alcon was challenged in the June 5, 2012 Democratic Primary, winning with 1,584 votes (55.2%) and was unopposed for the November 6, 2012 General election, winning with 4,838 votes.
2008 When District 6 Democratic Representative George Hanosh retired and left the seat open, Alcon ran in the three-way June 8, 2008 Democratic Primary, winning with 1,226 votes (42.5%) and won the November 4, 2008 General election with 5,494 votes (62%) against Republican nominee R. Grant Clawson, who had run for the seat in 2006.
2010 Alcon was unopposed for both the June 1, 2010 Democratic Primary, winning with 1,926 votes and the November 2, 2010 General election, winning with 4,838 votes.

References

External links
Official page at the New Mexico Legislature

Eliseo Alcon at Ballotpedia
Eliseo Lee Alcon at the National Institute on Money in State Politics

Place of birth missing (living people)
Year of birth missing (living people)
Living people
American politicians with disabilities
Democratic Party members of the New Mexico House of Representatives
People from Cibola County, New Mexico
21st-century American politicians